The 2005 Porsche Michelin Supercup season was the 13th Porsche Supercup season. The races were all supporting races in the 2005 Formula One season. It travelled to ten circuits across Europe, to Bahrain and a double-header at Indianapolis, US.

Teams and drivers

 Entered non-championship round at Bahrain

Race calendar and results

Championship standings

† — Drivers did not finish the race, but were classified as they completed over 90% of the race distance.

Teams' Championship

References

External links
The Porsche Mobil 1 Supercup website
Porsche Mobil 1 Supercup Online Magazine

Porsche Supercup seasons
Porsche Supercup